The 1965 Kent State Golden Flashes football team was an American football team that represented Kent State University in the Mid-American Conference (MAC) during the 1965 NCAA University Division football season. In their second season under head coach Leo Strang, the Golden Flashes compiled a 5–4–1 record (3–2–1 against MAC opponents), finished in fourth place in the MAC, and outscored all opponents by a combined total of 144 to 114.

The team's statistical leaders included Bill Asbury with 998 rushing yards, Ron Mollric with 407 passing yards, and Billy Blunt with 337 receiving yards. Four Kent State players were selected as first-team All-MAC players: halfback Bill Asbury, offensive tackle Jon Brooks, defensive back Pat Gucciardo, and offensive guard Ed Musbach.

Schedule

References

Kent State
Kent State Golden Flashes football seasons
Kent State Golden Flashes football